Tripp Family Homestead, also known as "Tripp House", is a historic house at 1101 N. Main Avenue in Scranton, Lackawanna County, Pennsylvania.

The oldest portion of the house was built around 1771 by Isaac Tripp, Scranton's first settler. Isaac Tripp II began later modification around 1778 and Isaac Tripp III further renovated the home in 1812, which left the building in a Federal style.  The building stayed in the Tripp family until 1900 and is the oldest building in Lackawanna County.  It is open as a special events facility.

The house was added to the National Register of Historic Places in 1972.

References

External links
Tripp House website

Houses on the National Register of Historic Places in Pennsylvania
Federal architecture in Pennsylvania
Houses completed in 1771
Houses in Lackawanna County, Pennsylvania
Buildings and structures in Scranton, Pennsylvania
National Register of Historic Places in Lackawanna County, Pennsylvania